Point Douglas to Superior Military Road, also known as Point Douglas to St. Louis River Military Road was a road that ran between Point Douglas, located at the outlet of the Lower St. Croix Lake near Hastings, Minnesota, first to the falls of the St. Louis River near Thomson, Minnesota, and later extended to the mouth of the St. Louis River in Superior, Wisconsin. From Douglas Point immediately east of Hastings, Minnesota, the route connected Stillwater, Taylors Falls, Sunrise, Chengwatana, Fortuna, Scotts Corner, to Thomson and Superior. Several discontinuous sections of this road are still in use.

History 
In 1852, the federal government began building the Point Douglas to Superior Military Road. Although intended as a highway for troop movement, this route from Hastings, Minnesota on the Mississippi River to Superior, Wisconsin on Lake Superior, was one of the first roads in Minnesota Territory and attracted a flood of civilian and commercial traffic. When Minnesota achieved statehood in 1858, responsibility for the road devolved to the state, which did not have the funds to finish the project. Although very rough and in places incomplete, the road was still the best route north until railroads were built in 1870. An alternative to the Military Road that ushered in the decline in use of the road came in 1895 when William Henry Grant built a spur of the Lake Superior and Mississippi Railroad to run to Sandstone, Minnesota. Traces of the unimproved military road can still be seen in Wild River State Park and Banning State Park.

Landmarks 

 Point Douglas to Superior Military Road: Deer Creek Section, Wild River State Park
 Point Douglas–St. Louis River Road Bridge, Stillwater, Minnesota

Existing sections 
 St. Croix Trail / County Road 21, Washington County, Minnesota
 St. Croix Trail / Minnesota Highway 95, Washington and Chisago Counties, Minnesota
 Lake Boulevard / U.S. Highway 8 / Minnesota Highway 95, Taylors Falls, Minnesota
 Vista Road / County Road 71, Shafer, Chisago County, Minnesota
 Wild Mountain Road / County Road, Amador Township, Chisago County, Minnesota
 Deer Creek Loop, Wild River State Park, Minnesota
 River Road, Amador and Sunrise Townships, Chisago County, Minnesota
 Sunrise Road / County Road 9, Sunrise Township, Chisago County, Minnesota
 Government Road / County Road 57, Sunrise and Rushseba Townships, Chisago County, Minnesota
 Government Road / County Road 55, Rushseba Township, Chisago County, Minnesota
 Government Road / County Road 106, Rock Creek, Pine County, Minnesota
 Government Road / County Highway 4, Rock Creek and Pine City Township, Pine County, Minnesota 
 Government Road, Pine City Township, Pine County, Minnesota
 Cross Lake Road / County Highway 9, Pine County, Minnesota
 Hinckley Road / County Highway 15, Mission Creek, Munch and Barry Townships, Pine County, Minnesota
 Government Road / County Road 140, Barry Township, Pine County, Minnesota
 Government Road, Barry and Sandstone Townships, Pine County, Minnesota
 Old Military Road, Sandstone, Minnesota
 Wolf Creek Trail, Banning State Park, Minnesota
 Interstate Highway 35, Finlayson Township, Pine County, Minnesota
 Old Military Road, Norman Township, Pine County, Minnesota
 Military Road, Norman and Windemere Townships, Pine County, Minnesota
 Military Road / County Highway 50, Pine County, Minnesota
 Military Road, Windemere Township, Pine County, Minnesota
 Military Road / County Road 13, Carlton County, Minnesota
 Military Road / Township Road 389, Carlton County, Minnesota
 Original routing
 County Road 4, Carlton County, Minnesota
 County Road 1, Carlton County, Minnesota
 Extended routing
 County Road 4, Carlton County, Minnesota
 County Road W, Douglas County, Wisconsin
 31st Avenue East, Superior, Wisconsin

Further reading 
 Payte, William. Field survey notes and abstract of proposals, Point Douglas and St. Louis River Road, 1855, 1857.
 Rubinstein, Sarah P. (2003) Minnesota history along the highways: a guide to historic markers and sites
 Singley, Grover (1974; reprint, 2002). "The Point Douglas-St. Louis River Road" in Tracing Minnesota's old government roads.
 Singley, Grover. "Retracing the military road from Point Douglas to Superior" in Minnesota history, v. 40, pp. 233-247.

Historic trails and roads in Wisconsin
Historic trails and roads in Minnesota
Military roads